State Highway 78 (SH 78) is a state highway that follows surface roads in a predominantly southwest-to-northeast direction in the Dallas area before traveling  north-northeast to the Oklahoma State border.

Route description
The highway's southern terminus is at Interstate 30 in Dallas.  From there, it follows Grand Avenue along White Rock Lake and then Garland Road into Garland as it passes Interstate 635. In downtown Garland, Highway 78 follows the central streets of Avenues B and D before joining Lavon Drive and moving northeastward.

It continues to the northeast through Sachse and Wylie, crossing between Lake Ray Hubbard and Lake Lavon. It passes through Lavon before turning north through Farmersville and Blue Ridge.  At SH 160, just before SH 121, SH 78 turns east, continuing to Leonard before turning northeast again to Bailey.  At Bailey, SH 78 turns north and cuts through Bonham (as Center Street) to reach Sowell's Bluff Bridge (a 1938 truss bridge) over the Red River.

The route continues as Oklahoma State Highway 78 through Durant to its terminus at Tishomingo.

History

The highway was originally designated on August 21, 1923, from Dallas to Bonham, replacing SH 5C. On May 19, 1924, the section from Desert to Bonham was cancelled. SH 78 was instead rerouted on its current route north of Desert to Bonham. On March 30, 1933, SH 78 was extended to Oklahoma. On October 6, 1943, SH 78 was extended south to Loop 12.
On June 21, 1951, the section from US 67 to Loop 12 was renumbered to Spur 244. US 67 was rerouted over current I-30, and the old route was transferred to rerouted SH 78 and the rest northeast of SH 78 was renumbered to FM 7, which was cancelled and transferred to SH 66 on November 30, 1961.

SH 78A was a spur designated on May 9, 1927 from Desert to Bells. This spur was renumbered as SH 160 on March 19, 1930.

Flooding 
In 1990, SH 78 was flooded, as engineers at the Lake Lavon Dam decided to release the water from the lake into the East Fork of the Trinity River. For a month and a half, the traffic going between Wylie and the eastern portion of Collin County was diverted to go through the city of Rockwall, a nearly  detour. The railroad that ran adjacent to the highway was completely washed out, and significant shoulder damage was done to the highway.

Junctions

References 

078
Transportation in Dallas County, Texas
Transportation in Collin County, Texas
Transportation in Fannin County, Texas